Garry Franchi (born December 3, 1983) is an Ivorian-born French professional footballer who plays in the Championnat National 2 for FC Chartres. His father is from Corsica and his mother from Morocco.

He played professionally in Ligue 2 for FC Lorient.

Career
Franchi came through the junior systems of AS Arnouville and FC Saint-Leu, joining the National Technical Centre at Clairefontaine aged 12. After three years he had offers to join four club academies, and chose FC Lorient.

He made his Ligue 2 debut for Lorient on 18 October 2003, coming on as a late substitute in a 2–0 away defeat to Caen. At the end of the season he signed a two-year professional contract with the club.

After leaving Lorient, Franchi joined Championnat National side L'Entente SSG. In July 2007 he joined US Orléans, where he stayed for four seasons, three in Championnat de France Amateur and the last in Championnat National. He moved on to AS Beauvais Oise in the summer of 2011.

In the summer of 2013, at the end of his contract, having featured in most league games for two seasons and despite a proposal from the club to extend his stay, Franchi elected to leave the club and join Trélissac. One season later he again moved to FC Chartres in Championnat National 3.

References

External links

1983 births
Living people
Footballers from Abidjan
Ivorian footballers
French footballers
Ligue 2 players
FC Lorient players
Entente SSG players
US Orléans players
AS Beauvais Oise players
Association football midfielders
Ivorian people of French descent
Ivorian people of Moroccan descent
French sportspeople of Moroccan descent
Ivorian emigrants to France